Jose bar Zebida (or Yose b. He is cited in the Jerusalem Talmud and the Midrash merely as R. Jose.

He often appears in the Babylonian Talmud arguing with R' Yossi bar Bun.

Though he lived in the Land of Israel, he is never mentioned by name in the Jerusalem Talmud. This surprising fact led to the suggestion that all places in which "R. Jose" is named in the Jerusalem Talmud are references to him.

Talmud rabbis of the Land of Israel